The Association of Independent Colleges and Universities in Massachusetts (AICUM),  is a grouping of accredited, independent, private colleges and universities in the state of Massachusetts. The Association advocates in public policy forums on behalf of its member institutions.

AICUM is headquartered in Boston, Massachusetts, and it was established by a panel of university presidents. Its current president is Richard Doherty. AICUM is a member of the Coalition for College Cost Savings, and the National Association of Independent Colleges and Universities

References

External links
 AICUM Website

College and university associations and consortia in the United States
1967 establishments in Massachusetts
Organizations established in 1967
Organizations based in Massachusetts